Slovenia was represented by 33 athletes (17 men and 16 women) at the 2010 European Athletics Championships held in Barcelona, Spain.

Participants

Results

References 
 Participants list

Nations at the 2010 European Athletics Championships
2010
European Athletics Championships